Carl Hochschild (1785–1857), was a Swedish baron and diplomat. He was the son of Rutger Fredrik Hochschild and father of Carl Fredrik Hochschild. After service in the Cabinet for Foreign Letters of Exchange and at different missions, he was minister in Copenhagen 1821–1836, chamberlain in 1826, minister in The Hague 1836–1841, Vienna 1845–1850, envoy in Berlin 1850–1854 and in London 1854–1857.

References

1785 births
1857 deaths
Barons of Sweden
Ambassadors of Sweden to Denmark
Ambassadors of Sweden to the Netherlands
Ambassadors of Sweden to the Austrian Empire
Ambassadors of Sweden to Germany
Ambassadors of Sweden to the United Kingdom